Adah may refer to:
 Adah, the first wife of either Lamech or of Esau
 The name of Jephthah's daughter, according to the Order of the Eastern Star
 The name of The Orozco's first born daughter

Places
 Adah, Pennsylvania
 ADAH, acronym for the Alabama Department of Archives and History
 Adah Rose Gallery, a fine arts gallery in Kensington, MD

People
 Adah Almutairi (born 1976)
 Adah Belle Thoms (1870–1943), African-American nurse of World War I
 Adah Isaacs Menken (1835–1868), American actress, painter, and poet
 Adah Jenkins (1901–1973), Civil rights activist, musician, teacher, and a music critic
 Adah Robinson (1882–1962), American artist, designer and teacher
 Adah Sharma (born 1992), Indian film actress
 Afure Adah (born 1997), Papua New Guinean sprinter
 Joseph Adah (born 1997), Nigerian footballer
 Adah Zella (born 2023)

See also
 Ada (disambiguation)
 Adha (disambiguation)